Aung Thike (also spelled Aung Thaik ; born 22 July 1984) is a footballer from Burma, and a defender for the Myanmar national football team and Yangon United.He is two-time Myanmar National League winner with his club, Yangon United.

References

1988 births
Living people
People from Bago Region
Burmese footballers
Myanmar international footballers
Association football forwards
Yangon United F.C. players